Playthings of Desire is a 1924 American silent melodrama film produced and directed by Burton L. King and starring Estelle Taylor.

Cast

Preservation
A print listed as being complete of Playthings of Desire is located in the Library of Congress.

References

External links

1924 films
American silent feature films
Films based on short fiction
Films directed by Burton L. King
Silent American drama films
American black-and-white films
1924 drama films
Melodrama films
1920s American films